Raymond Dyral Mathews (February 26, 1929 – December 20, 2015) was an American football halfback and end in the National Football League (NFL) for the Pittsburgh Steelers and the Dallas Cowboys. He played college football for Clemson University.

Early years
Mathews attended McKeesport Area High School, before moving on to Clemson University, where he played baseball and football. He was the starting halfback in a backfield that included Fred Cone.

The 1948 team finished undefeated and beat the University of Missouri, 24-23, in the 1949 Gator Bowl.

As a senior, he was a part of another undefeated season and played in the 1951 Orange Bowl, beating the University of Miami 15–14. He made an acrobatic reception for one of the touchdowns.

In 1978, he was inducted into the Clemson Athletic Hall of Fame.

Professional career

Pittsburgh Steelers
Mathews was selected by the Pittsburgh Steelers in the seventh round (81st overall) of the 1951 NFL Draft. He was mostly a backup to running back Fran Rogel. Because of his speed, he was switched to wide receiver in 1956. He was also used as a kickoff and punt returner.

He was the team's leading rusher in 1952, with 315 yards on 66 carries. He led the team in receiving in three straight seasons (1954-1956). He finished his Steelers career after appearing in 108 games with 230 receptions for 3,919 yards and 34 touchdowns, while rushing for 1,057 yards and five touchdowns on 300 carries. He also held the franchise records for longest reception (78 yards) and most touchdowns in a game (4). In 2007, he was named to the Pittsburgh Steelers Legends team.

Dallas Cowboys
Mathews was selected by the Dallas Cowboys in the 1960 NFL Expansion Draft. He was the team captain for the first game in franchise history. He appeared in 6 games as a reserve player, while reuniting with former college teammate Fred Cone.

Personal life
Early in the 1950s, he played four seasons of minor-league baseball in the St. Louis Browns farm system.

After retiring as a player, he was a high school coach for five seasons at Braddock, Pennsylvania, an assistant coach for the Washington Redskins and the Calgary Stampeders. On December 20, 2015, he died of complications from dementia.

References

External links
 

1929 births
2015 deaths
People from Armstrong County, Pennsylvania
Players of American football from Pennsylvania
American football ends
American football halfbacks
Calgary Stampeders coaches
Clemson Tigers football players
Dallas Cowboys players
Pittsburgh Steelers players
Washington Redskins coaches
Eastern Conference Pro Bowl players
Deaths from dementia in Pennsylvania